Kornatka may refer to the following places:
Kornatka, Lesser Poland Voivodeship (south Poland)
Kornatka, Pomeranian Voivodeship (north Poland)
Kornatka, West Pomeranian Voivodeship (north-west Poland)